Swedish Championship may refer to:

Swedish Championships in Alpine skiing
Athletics
Swedish Athletics Championships
Swedish Indoor Athletics Championships
Swedish National Badminton Championships
List of Swedish bandy champions
Swedish Chess Championship
Swedish Championships in Cross-country skiing
Swedish Figure Skating Championships
List of Swedish football champions
List of Swedish ice hockey champions
Motor sport
Swedish Speedway Championship
Swedish Touring Car Championship
Swimming
Swedish Swimming Championships
Swedish Short Course Swimming Championships
Swedish Junior's Swimming Championships
Swedish Youth Swimming Championships
Swedish Youth Short Course Swimming Championships
Table tennis
Swedish Table Tennis Championships
Swedish Open Championships